Le Bar-sur-Loup (literally Le Bar on Loup;) is a commune in the Alpes-Maritimes department in southeastern France.

Originally known simply as Le Bar, the commune was renamed Le Bar-sur-Loup by a decree dated 27 March 1961 published in the Journal Officiel on 1 April, with effect from 2 April 1961.

Its inhabitants are known as aubarnais - aubarnenc in Occitan - or simply barois.

Geography
The commune gets its name from the Loup, a coastal river that runs through it. The Loup flows into the Mediterranean near Villeneuve-Loubet.

History
The first record of the commune was recorded in 1078, in the book Albarnum or Poncii Albarni. In 1235, the village was renamed to Catrum de Albarno, and throughout the 16th century, it was renamed to Lou Barn, Le Barn, and finally Le Bar-sur-Loup.

Places and monuments
Church of Saint-Jacques-le-Majeur
The carvings on the door are quite notable. On the inside is an altarpiece painted by Ludovico Brea, dating to the 16th century, as well as statues from the 17th century. In the back of the church, there is a wood carving of a danse macabre from the 15th century.

Le château des comtes de Grasse 
A quadrangular building built on vaulted cellars, with two towers to the south and a smaller one to the north. The castle was sacked in 1792 and sold to the villagers in 1832. Restored, it was divided into apartments. It was the birthplace of François Joseph Paul de Grasse on 13 September 1722. He became the Comte de Grasse and served as a career French naval general,

At the entrance to the courtyard before the castle is a broad-based square tower. This is the old castle keep, now used as a tourist office. Before it was dismantled in 1792, it had seven storeys. A museum has been set up on the first floor which tells the stories of the village's most famous residents. The Chateau de Grasse is now operated as a hotel.

Gallery

Population

Legend
During Lent, a count in Le Bar held a party during which all the guests died. A danse macabre was painted to commemorate this divine punishment. It shows Death as an archer, firing arrows at the guests. Ghosts rise from the mouths of the corpses in the form of small, naked people, who are weighed in a balance held by Saint Michael (sitting at the feet of Christ). The ghosts are sent into the jaws of a monster, representing the entrance to hell.

Notable persons
 François Joseph Paul de Grasse (1722-1788), Comte de Grasse and career naval officer who made rank of admiral and was a hero to the American Revolutionary War, defeating the British in a critical battle.

Sister city
Le Bar-sur-Loup has a sister city:
 Poquoson, Virginia, United States of America.

See also
Communes of the Alpes-Maritimes department

References

Communes of Alpes-Maritimes